Padfoot may refer to:

Black dog (folklore), one of many names for ghostly black dogs reported across the United Kingdom
Nickname of Sirius Black from the Harry Potter series of novels and adaptations whose Animagus form is a Black dog